Ludwig Friedrich Theodor Hain (5 July 1781, in Stargard – 27 June 1836, in Munich) was a German editor and bibliographer.

He studied classical philology and Oriental languages at the University of Halle, and from 1802 lived and worked in Weimar. For several years he was an editor of Brockhaus' Conversations-Lexikon in Altenburg (from 1812) and Leipzig. Later on in his career, he worked as private scholar in Munich.
 
He is best known as the compiler of Repertorium bibliographicum (1822), a pioneering short title catalogue of incunabula. "Hain numbers" are still used as common bibliographical references.

His work has since been superseded by the Incunabula Short Title Catalogue (ISTC) at the British Library and the Gesamtkatalog der Wiegendrucke (GW) at the Staatsbibliothek zu Berlin.

References

Bibliography

External links 
 
 Repertorium bibliographicum at Google Books
 Supplement to Hain's Repertorium bibliographicum by Walter Arthur Copinger (1902).
 Appendices ad Hainii-Copingeri Repertorium bibliographicum by Dietrich Reichling (1914).

1781 births
1836 deaths
19th-century German writers
Bibliographers
Incunabula
German bibliographers
19th-century German male writers
People from Stargard
University of Halle alumni
German male non-fiction writers